In professional sports, a holdout (also written as hold out) occurs when a player fails to report to their team—usually before the start of a season—or fails to perform the services outlined in the terms of their contract. Players holdout for various reasons, however the desired outcome is usually to renegotiate their contract to more favorable terms. Players have also failed to report to a team after being drafted out of college, usually because they do not want to play for that team or want to play another sport. Although a player in this scenario has not signed a contract, they are usually considered a holdout because the team that drafted them secures exclusive rights to sign them to contract. A famous example of this was the Tampa Bay Buccaneers drafting Bo Jackson with the first pick of the 1986 NFL Draft; Jackson did not report to the team because he wanted to pursue a career as a baseball player. The length of a holdout can range from just a few days to an entire season, or even indefinitely. Some players have utilized just the threat of a holdout to try to gain leverage in contract negotiations.

Notable examples

National Football League 

 With the first overall pick in the 1986 NFL draft, the Tampa Bay Buccaneers drafted Bo Jackson despite him telling the team he wanted to pursue a career as a baseball player. He never signed with the team.

National Basketball Association 

 Following a loss in the 2021 NBA playoffs in Game 7 against the Atlanta Hawks, Ben Simmons demanded a trade and held out from participating in training camp and the regular season. The 76ers fined Simmons for conduct detrimental to the team, reportedly in excess of $19 million. After eight months, the 76ers traded Simmons along with players and picks to the Brooklyn Nets for James Harden and Paul Millsap.

National Hockey League 

 Alexei Yashin sat out the 1999–2000 NHL season due to a contract dispute in the final year of his five year deal. He returned for the following season as a result of an arbitration case which determined that Yashin owed an additional year on his contract before he could become a free agent.

See also

Lockout (sports)

References

Terminology used in multiple sports